En Vivo (Eng.: Live) is the first live album released by Marco Antonio Solís from El Teatro de Bellas Artes Puerto Rico on October 30, 2000.

Track listing

All songs written and composed by Marco Antonio Solís except for En Mi Viejo San Juan

Personnel 
This information from music.barnesandnoble.com.

Bebu Silvetti - conductor
Victor Aguilar - percussion
Salo Loyo - piano
Rodolfo Luviano -  synthesizer, keyboards
Emilio García - drums
Fabian Perez - acoustic guitar, electric guitar
Fabiola Antunez - background vocals
Fidel Arreygue - bass
Gustavo Borner - mastering
Charles Paakkari - engineer
Ezra Kliger - string coordinator
Javier García - contributor
Henry Hutchinson - contributor
Carlos Francisco Hernandez - monitor engineer

References

External links
Marco Antonio Solís Official website
 En Vivo on music.barnesandnoble.com

Spanish-language live albums
2000 live albums
Marco Antonio Solís live albums
Fonovisa Records live albums